Enneapterygius minutus, the minute triplefin, is a species of triplefin blenny in the genus Enneapterygius. It was described by Günther in 1877. It is found in the Indo-Pacific south to Australia, north to the Ryukyu Islands and east to American Samoa.

References

minutus
Fish described in 1877
Taxa named by Albert Günther